Asaf Mikhailovich Messerer (Russian: Асаф Михайлович Мессерер, November 19, 1903 - March 7, 1992) was a highly influential Soviet ballet dancer and ballet teacher. He was born in Vilnius, Lithuania. From 1919 until 1921 he trained as a dancer at the Moscow Bolshoi Ballet School. He then joined the Bolshoi Theatre, where he became one of its most important principal soloists, a position he retired from in 1954. 

Today Messerer is best remembered as a choreographer and an instructor; he was both the choreographer and ballet master for the Bolshoi Theatre. His book Classes in Classical Ballet is a thorough study of proper ballet technique and is still used today.

Messerer was the brother of Sulamith Messerer and Rachel Messerer and the uncle of Maya Plisetskaya, Alexander Plisetski and Azari Plisetski, as well as of Mikhail Messerer. He was married to silent film star, Anel Sudakevich. They had one son, Boris Messerer. He won multiple awards from the USSR and from Lithuania.

See also
 List of Russian ballet dancers

External links
 Asaf Messerer, soloist (1940): Ribbon Dance, Music by Reinhold Gliere (1875-1956), Choreography by Messerer and Lashchulin, Open Source Movies
Archive film of Asaf Messerer's Spring Waters in 1979 at Jacob's Pillow

1903 births
1992 deaths
Dancers from Vilnius
People from Vilensky Uyezd
Plisetski–Messerer family
Lithuanian Jews
Soviet male ballet dancers
Ballet choreographers
Soviet choreographers
Ballet teachers
Soviet educators
Jewish dancers
Recipients of the Order of Friendship of Peoples
People's Artists of the USSR
People's Artists of the RSFSR
Stalin Prize winners
Burials at Novodevichy Cemetery